Sustainability studies is an academic discipline that focuses on the interdisciplinary perspective of the concept of sustainability. Programs include instruction in sustainable development, geography, environmental policies, ethics, ecology, landscape architecture, city and regional planning, economics, natural resources, sociology, and anthropology. Sustainability studies also focuses on the importance of climate change, poverty and development. Many universities across the United States currently offer sustainability studies as a degree program. The main goal of sustainability studies is for students to find ways to develop novel solutions to environmental problems.

History 
Towards the end of the 1980s, a new focus emerged globally on the importance of the environment and ecological sustainability. In 1987 the Brundtland Report was delivered by the World Commission on Environment and Development. The commission was appointed to examine the consequences of global environmental change and was chaired by Norway’s Prime Minister, Gro Harlem Brundtland. It introduced the concept of sustainable development, defined as “development that meets the needs of the present without compromising the ability of future generations to meet their own needs”. Several definitions have been proposed since then (refer to (Pezzoli, 1997) among others) but after almost 20 years of debate there seems to be a consensus that sustainability assessments ought to: integrate economic, environmental, social and increasingly institutional issues as well as to consider their interdependencies; consider the consequences of present actions well into the future; acknowledge the existence of uncertainties concerning the result of our present actions and act with a precautionary bias; engage the public; includes equity considerations (intragenerational and intergenerational). This report started a paradigm shift in which global actors began to engage in initiatives that sought to focus on sustainable development.

Five years after the report was launched, the UN Earth’s Summit in Rio adopted the Framework Convention on Climate Change. Five years later this framework helped lead to the creation of the Kyoto Protocol, a plan in which rich nations pledged to reduce their carbon emissions. All countries that partook in the United Nations Framework Convention on Climate Change (UNFCCC) also signed up to the Kyoto Protocol. Unfortunately progress towards sustainability stalled when the Kyoto Protocol was never ratified by the United States, and other nations consequently ignored their pledges in the agreement.

Recently, the United Nations (UN) Intergovernmental Panel on Climate Change (IPCC) released a report that says “urgent and unprecedented changes are needed to reach the target” of keeping the global temperature at moderate levels. They state that countries must follow the Paris Agreement pledge to keep temperatures between 1.5 degrees Celsius and 2 degrees Celsius, otherwise the earth will faces extreme challenges from climate change, including the eradication of corals and the accelerated melting of Arctic ice caps.  The IPCC also explained that a rise in temperatures would trigger catastrophic results in the form of intense natural disasters, unpredictable weather, and food shortages.  In order to prevent this outcome governments would need to require a “supercharged roll-back of emissions courses that have built up over the past 250 years.” In order to do so developments in land use and technological changes are necessary. Carbon dioxide emissions would have to be cut by 45% by 2030 and come down to 0 by 2050. Although this would require carbon prices to be three to four times higher, the consequences of global warming at the current rate would be far more severe. The world is currently on course to reach 3 degrees Celsius of global warming, and scientists have 12 years to impose significant changes to prevent this from happening. This shift towards environmental protection demands a workforce that is more heavily dedicated to studying sustainable development, hence the growing importance of interdisciplinary studies. Individuals studying sustainable development will likely be focused on reducing the climate in which catastrophic global warming would take place and understanding how policy decisions link to other areas such as urban planning, sociology, economics and ecology.

Careers in sustainability studies 
An education in sustainability studies emphasizes an interdisciplinary approach to environmental problems, so it can lead into many future careers such as:

 Law
 Politics
 Policy and Planning
 Journalism
 Business and Architectural Design
 Marine Sciences
 Sustainability Professionals
 Urban planning

The salary range for a professional involved in sustainability studies is $75,000 to $93,000, and is based on the average salaries of those involved in engineering and environmental sciences. Chief sustainability executives earn an average of $167,000.

See also 
 List of environmental degrees

References

Environmental studies
Sustainability